Shewanella algidipiscicola is a Gram-negative and psychrotolerant bacterium from the genus of Shewanella which has been isolated from a fish from the Baltic Sea off Denmark.

References

External links
Type strain of Shewanella algidipiscicola at BacDive -  the Bacterial Diversity Metadatabase

Alteromonadales
Bacteria described in 2007